Liga Sepak Bola Utama (English: Premier Football League), commonly known by its acronym Galatama, was a semi professional football league in Indonesia, established in 1979 by the Indonesian Football Association, PSSI. Prior to the establishment of the competition, an amateur football league named Perserikatan had existed since 1931. Both Perserikatan and Galatama existed and run in parallel until 1994 when they were both merged to form a new, unified league called Liga Indonesia.

History 

Until 1979, the Perserikatan, an amateur competition, was the only national-level competition in Indonesia. Starting in 1979, Football Association of Indonesia started a semi-professional league, named Liga Sepak Bola Utama, shortened to Galatama. Galatama is one of the pioneers of professional and semi-professional football league in Asia alongside the Hong Kong League.

Throughout its history, Galatama always operated in a single-division format except for the 1982–83 and 1990 seasons, when it was divided into two divisions.

Until the 1982–83 season, Galatama allowed the recruitment of foreign players. One of the most famous foreign players in the competition is Fandi Ahmad (Singapore) who played for NIAC Mitra. He successfully led his club to win the Galatama title and he also became an honorary citizen of Surabaya as an award for his performances with NIAC Mitra. Fandi Ahmad and other foreign players were forced to ply their trade outside of Indonesia after the league banned foreign players.

Galatama suffered a decline in its final years. The cause of the decline is blamed on the banning of foreign players, match-fixing allegations, and referee bribery scandals. The declining popularity of the league amongst the Indonesian football fans forced many of the league's member clubs to gradually withdraw.

In 1994, Galatama and Perserikatan were merged into the fully professional Liga Indonesia.

List of champions

List of top scorers

References

Works cited

 
Defunct football leagues in Indonesia
Defunct top level football leagues in Asia